The General Court of Massachusetts Bay Colony enacted a law in November 1646 providing, among other things, for the capital punishment of male children that were disobedient to their parents. Although death as a penalty was later removed and punishment for disobedient daughters was added, the law was not repealed until 1973. Similar laws were enacted in Connecticut in 1650, Rhode Island in 1688, and New Hampshire in 1679.

The Massachusetts law stated:

References 

Capital punishment in Massachusetts
Massachusetts law
Family